
 

Cadgee is a locality in the Australian state of South Australia located in the state's south-east within the Limestone Coast region about  south east of the state capital of Adelaide and about  north of the municipal seat of Naracoorte.

Boundaries were created in April 2001 for the “long established name.”

The majority land use within the locality is primary production.  A parcel of land at the locality’s western end was proclaimed in 1972 as a protected area known as the Grass Tree Conservation Park.

Cadgee is located within the federal division of Barker, the state electoral district of MacKillop and the local government area of the Naracoorte Lucindale Council.

References

Towns in South Australia
Limestone Coast